Norihiko (written: , , ,  or ) is a masculine Japanese given name. Notable people with the name include:

, Japanese politician
, Japanese video game composer and saxophonist
, Japanese basketball player
, Japanese swimmer
, Japanese photographer
, Japanese volleyball player

Japanese masculine given names